Rômulo Zanre Zwarg (born March 1, 2000), also known as Rômulo Zanre or simply Rômulo, is a Brazilian footballer who currently plays as a midfielder for Brazilian side Athletic Club on loan from Esporte Clube Juventude.

Career
From 2018 to 2019, Rômulo played for the Brazilian Série A side Cruzeiro on loan from Paulista Série A3 side Desportivo Brasil, where he made appearances for the youth team and was only called up to two Série A matches. After ending his loan, on 2020 season he was transferred to the Chilean Primera División club Deportes La Serena, scoring his first goal at professional level on December 21, 2020.

Honours

Club
Cruzeiro
 Campeonato Mineiro (1): 2019

References

External links

Rômulo Zwarg at playmakerstats.com (English version of ceroacero.es)

Living people
2000 births
People from Campo Grande
Sportspeople from Mato Grosso do Sul
Brazilian footballers
Campeonato Brasileiro Série A players
Chilean Primera División players
Desportivo Brasil players
Cruzeiro Esporte Clube players
Deportes La Serena footballers
Esporte Clube Juventude players
Brazilian expatriate footballers
Expatriate footballers in Chile
Brazilian expatriate sportspeople in Chile
Association football midfielders
Brazilian people of German descent